Lauren O'Farrell, (born 1977) also known as Deadly Knitshade, is an English author and artist. She is best known for playing a major part in the beginnings of the UK graffiti knitting street art scene, creating the Stitch London craft community and founding graffiti knitting and craft collective Knit the City.

As a graffiti knitting street artist she is attributed with creating the term 'yarnstorming' as a less violent alternative to the popular yarnbombing in graffiti knitting and the creation of the 'stitched story' style of graffiti knitting using amigurumi and handmade objects to create a themed artwork rather than the traditional cosy.

Lauren creates her art under the Whodunnknit label and works and lives in London.

Books
 O'Farrell, Lauren (2011) Stitch London: 20 Kooky Ways to Knit the City and More UK: David & Charles
 Knitshade, Deadly (2011) Knit the city: A Whodunnknit Set in London. UK: Summersdale.
 O'Farrell, Lauren (2013) Stitch New York: 20 Kooky Ways to Knit the City and More UK: David & Charles

References

External links
 Whodunnknit website
 Knit the City website
 Stitch London website
 Agent page

English non-fiction writers
English women artists
1977 births
Living people
People from Cheltenham
People in knitting